Buraki-ye Sofla (also Romanized as Būrakī-ye Soflá and Būrakī-e Soflá; also known as Būraki, Būrakī Pā’īn, and Būrakī-ye Pā’īn) is a village in Khesht Rural District, Khesht District, Kazerun County, Fars Province, Iran. At the 2006 census, its population was 269, in 46 families.

References 

Populated places in Kazerun County